Georges Perros (23 August 1923, Paris – 24 January 1978, Douarnenez) was a French writer.

He was awarded the Prix Valery Larbaud in 1973.

1923 births
1978 deaths
Writers from Paris
Lycée Condorcet alumni
Prix Valery Larbaud winners
French male writers
20th-century French male writers